Tamako (written:  or ) is a feminine Japanese given name. Notable people with the name include:

, Japanese empress consort
, Japanese painter

Fictional characters
, a character in the manga series Isuca
, a character in the manga series Rin-ne
, a character in the manga series Barakamon
, a character in the manga series Silver Spoon
, protagonist of the anime series Tamako Market
, a character in the manga series Kemeko Deluxe!
, a character in the manga series Nozoki Ana
, a character in the manga series Anima Yell!
, protagonist of the film Tamako in Moratorium

Japanese feminine given names